The Sinjar Resistance Units (YBŞ) is a Yazidi militia formed in Iraq in 2007 to protect Yazidis in Iraq in the wake of attacks by Sunni Islamist insurgents. It is the second largest Yazidi militia, after the Êzîdxan Protection Force (HPÊ). However, it is much more active than the HPÊ in fighting against the Islamic State of Iraq and the Levant (ISIL).

Together with its newly founded all-women offshoot, the Êzîdxan Women's Units (YJÊ), and the formerly Peshmerga-aligned HPŞ, in October 2015 it founded the all-Yazidi joint command umbrella structure Sinjar Alliance. YBŞ and YJÊ are part of the Kurdistan Communities Union (KCK) and work with the People's Defence Forces (HPG) of the Kurdistan Workers' Party (PKK). Parts of the YBŞ eventually joined the Popular Mobilization Forces (PMF) as part of an initiative to integrate into the regular Iraqi Armed Forces; these elements are officially known as the 80th Regiment.

History

The Sinjar Resistance Units took part in the August 2014 Northern Iraq offensive, killing at least 22 fighters of the Islamic State and destroying five armored vehicles in the vicinity of the Sinjar Mountains.

Hundreds of Yazidis received training from People's Protection Units (YPG) instructors at the Serimli military base in Qamishli, Syria, before being sent back to the Mount Sinjar frontlines. These forces were re-branded as the "Sinjar Resistance Units".

Its commander Sheikh Khairy Khedr was killed in action during the October 2014 clashes in Sinjar.

There have been increased tensions between the YBŞ and the Kurdistan Regional Government (KRG). KRG Peshmerga forces fled Mount Sinjar when the Islamic State first attacked, leaving many Yazidis resentful and distrustful.

In October 2015, the YBŞ participated in the foundation of the Sinjar Alliance as an all-Yazidi joint commando umbrella structure. Besides their all-women offshoot, the Êzîdxan Women's Units (YJÊ), the formerly Peshmerga-aligned Protection Force of Sinjar (HPŞ) and other independent Yazidi units committed to the united Yazidi front.

Under the joint command of the Sinjar Alliance, the Sinjar Resistance Units took part in the November 2015 Sinjar offensive. In 2017, KRG-aligned media outlets claimed that around 800 members had left the YBŞ, and that 400 of them had joined the Peshmerga.

In accordance with an agreement of the Iraqi government, parts of the YBŞ joined the Popular Mobilization Forces as the "80th Regiment", while transferring several positions in the Sinjar Mountains to the Iraqi Army. However, the Iraqi military demanded that the YBŞ and other local militias withdrew from further posts as of early 2021; these demands were fuelled by the Iraqi government's desire to remove the PKK's presence from the Sinjar area. The YBŞ and other groups initially refused to follow these orders, arguing that they were not affiliated with the PKK.

See also
 December 2014 Sinjar offensive
 List of Yazidi settlements
 List of armed groups in the Iraqi Civil War
 Genocide of Yazidis by ISIL

References

External links

Apoist organizations in Iraq
Anti-ISIL factions in Iraq
War in Iraq (2013–2017)
Sinjar Alliance
2007 establishments in Iraq
Military units and formations established in 2007
Yazidi organizations in Iraq